Upper Kintore is a Canadian rural community in Victoria County, New Brunswick.

History

It received its name from migrants on the ship Castella who named it after Kintore, Scotland.

Notable people

See also
List of communities in New Brunswick

References

Communities in Victoria County, New Brunswick